Sanctus Ignis is the debut album by French progressive/neoclassical metal band Adagio, released on 8 May 2001 in France by Nothing to Say and in Europe by Limb Music.

Track listing

Reception 

Sanctus Ignis was well received by critics. Gary Hill of AllMusic said "this is a superior album in the neo-classically tinged metal genre."

Personnel

Adagio 
 David Readman – vocals
 Stéphan Forté – guitar, keyboard
 Richard Andersson – keyboard
 Franck Hermanny – bass guitar
 Dirk Bruinenberg – drums

Production 
 Dennis Ward – production, mixing, engineering
 Isabel De Amorim – artwork
 Marc Villalonga – photography

References 

2001 debut albums
Albums produced by Dennis Ward (musician)
Adagio (band) albums
Limb Music albums